José Manuel Carabalí (born January 6, 1970) is a retired male track and field athlete from Venezuela. He competed for his native South American country at the 2000 Summer Olympics in Sydney, Australia, where he was eliminated in the first round of the men's 4x100 metres relay, alongside Hely Ollarves, Juan Morillo, and José Peña.

Achievements

References

External links

1970 births
Living people
Venezuelan male sprinters
Athletes (track and field) at the 2000 Summer Olympics
Olympic athletes of Venezuela
Central American and Caribbean Games bronze medalists for Venezuela
Competitors at the 2002 Central American and Caribbean Games
Central American and Caribbean Games medalists in athletics
20th-century Venezuelan people
21st-century Venezuelan people